Byron Samuels (born May 3, 1964) is a former college basketball head coach. He was previously the head coach for Florida A&M University.

Head coaching record

References

1964 births
Living people
African-American basketball coaches
African-American basketball players
Florida A&M Rattlers basketball coaches
Florida A&M Rattlers basketball players
Hampton Pirates men's basketball coaches
Radford Highlanders men's basketball coaches
South Florida Bulls men's basketball coaches
Tennessee Volunteers basketball coaches
Tulsa Golden Hurricane men's basketball coaches
Washington State Cougars men's basketball coaches
UNC Wilmington Seahawks men's basketball coaches
American men's basketball players
21st-century African-American people
20th-century African-American sportspeople